Hypopleurona is a genus of moths of the family Erebidae. The genus was erected by George Hampson in 1926.

Species
Hypopleurona acutissima (Bethune-Baker, 1911) Angola
Hypopleurona submarginalis Gaede, 1940 Cameroon

References

Calpinae